La Paz is a town in the northeast of the province of Mendoza, Argentina, located on National Route 7, north of the Tunuyán River.

External links

 Municipality of La Paz – official website
 

Populated places in Mendoza Province
Cities in Argentina
Argentina
Mendoza Province